Abbot's Tower is a late-16th-century tower house situated near New Abbey, Dumfries and Galloway, Scotland, that was built by the Abbot of Sweetheart Abbey. The building was restored in the early 1990s and is now used as a private residence and as a bed and breakfast. This structure should not be confused with the Abbot's Tower of Alnwick Castle.

History
The tower was built in the late 16th century as a refuge by Gilbert Broun, S.O.Cist., the last  Abbot of the Cistercian Sweetheart Abbey. Despite the abbey's suppression during the Scottish Reformation, Broun continued to uphold the Roman Catholic faith until he was arrested in 1605 and ultimately exiled.

Structure
Each has a fireplace at one end and there was a garderobe in the south corner. The west and staircase walls were almost complete, but portions of the other walls had fallen and the hewn stones taken.

Archaeological investigations in the early 1990s revealed remnants of outbuildings and portions of what were probably foundations of the barmkin walls. The tower was restored and converted into a private residence in the 1990s. As of 2020, the owners operate the tower as a bed and breakfast.

References

Bibliography
 Coventry, Martin (2001) The Castles of Scotland, 3rd Ed. Scotland: Goblinshead  
Maxwell-Irving, A. M. T. (2000) The Border Towers of Scotland, Creedon Publications

External links
 Photograph of the tower before restoration at scran.ac.uk
 Abbotstower.com

Castles in Kirkcudbrightshire
Castles in Dumfries and Galloway